The Anclote Keys Light is a lighthouse built in 1887 on Anclote Key, the largest of the Anclote Keys. It is a skeletal square pyramidal tower, painted brown, with a black lantern. After the lighthouse was automated in 1952 the tower and other buildings at the site were often vandalized, interfering with the operation of the light. The Coast Guard determined that the light was no longer needed and deactivated it in 1984. The site was eventually turned over to the State of Florida and added to Anclote Key Preserve State Park. As of 2003 the lighthouse has been restored and relighted using a reproduction fourth-order Fresnel lens. Anclote Key is accessible only by boat.

It is listed as Anclote Key Light number 1555 in the USCG light lists.

Head keepers
 James Gardner (1887 – 1888)
 Samuel E. Hope, Jr. (1888 – 1889)
 James M. Baggett (1889 – 1891)
 Robert S. Meyer (1891 – 1914)
 Thomas A. Moody (1914 – 1923)
 Robert S. Meyer (1923 – 1933), 
 James L. Pippin (1933 – at least 1949)

See also

 List of lighthouses in Florida
 List of lighthouses in the United States

References

Further reading

External links

 

Lighthouses completed in 1887
Lighthouses on the National Register of Historic Places in Florida
National Register of Historic Places in Pinellas County, Florida
1887 establishments in Florida
Transportation buildings and structures in Pinellas County, Florida